Ioannis Papadiamantopoulos may refer to:

 Ioannis Papadiamantopoulos (1766–1826), Greek revolutionary leader
 Ioannis Papadiamantopoulos (major general), Greek officer
 Jean Moréas (born Ioannis A. Papadiamantopoulos), poet